×

La Molsosa is a municipality in the comarca of the Solsonès in Catalonia, Spain. It is situated in the south of the comarca in the Castelltallat range. It is linked to Calaf by a local road. The municipality is split into two parts, the bigger eastern part having nearly all the population. La Molsosa became part of the Solsonès in the comarcal revision of 1990: previously it formed part of the Anoia.

Population

References

 Panareda Clopés, Josep Maria; Rios Calvet, Jaume; Rabella Vives, Josep Maria (1989). Guia de Catalunya, Barcelona: Caixa de Catalunya.  (Spanish).  (Catalan).

External links
Official website 
 Government data pages 

Municipalities in Solsonès
Populated places in Solsonès